Duke of Uceda is a hereditary title in the Peerage of Spain, accompanied by the dignity of Grandee and granted in 1610 by Philip III to Cristóbal Gómez de Sandoval, who succeeded his father Francisco Gómez de Sandoval, 1st Duke of Lerma as the king's favourite.

The name refers to the town of Uceda in Guadalajara, where Cristóbal Gómez de Sandoval owned lands.

Dukes of Uceda

See also

List of dukes in the peerage of Spain
List of current Grandees of Spain

References

 
Dukedoms of Spain